HMS Echo was a 24-gun sixth-rate of the Royal Navy, in active service between 1758 and 1764, during the Seven Years' War. 

Stationed in the Caribbean, she captured a total of five enemy vessels over the following five years. She was declared surplus to Navy requirement at the end of the War in 1763, and was decommissioned at Chatham Dockyard. After six years at the Dockyard, she was sold out of service in 1770.

Construction
Construction commenced in 1756 in Nantes, shortly after the outbreak of war between France and Britain. The vessel was originally intended as a privateer named Le Maréchal de Richelieu, but was purchased by the French Navy in December 1758. Completed in early 1759, she was commissioned into that Navy as the 28-gun corvette LEcho and assigned to duties in the French Caribbean.

Her sides were low, with a hold depth of only , nearly  less than similar vessels such as the privateer La Marie Victoire. Her armament as a French vessel was 28 guns, comprising 24 nine-pounder cannons and four smaller weapons. After her capture by the British these four smaller guns were removed. Her crew numbers as a French vessel are unrecorded; the designated Royal Navy complement was 160 men.

Citations and references
Citations

References
 

1757 ships
Ships built in France
Captured ships
Sixth rates of the Royal Navy